This is a list of notable footballers who have played for Scarborough. Generally, this means players that have played 100 or more league appearances for the club. However, some players who have played fewer matches are also included; this includes holders of a club record and players who gained international caps whilst with the club. The list only includes statistics available for the Football League, as a source is not available for the period of 1889–1987.

For a list of all Scarborough players, major or minor, with a Wikipedia article, see :Category:Scarborough F.C. players.

Notable players
Appearances and goals are for league matches only, as complete appearance data is not available for some players. Statistics correct as of 6 November 2007.

Notes

References

List of Scarborough players
Scarborough F.C.
Association football player non-biographical articles